Hugh William Paddick (22 August 1915 – 9 November 2000) was an English actor. He starred in the 1960s BBC radio show Round the Horne, performing in sketches such as "Charles and Fiona" (as Charles) and "Julian and Sandy" (as Julian). He and Kenneth Williams were largely responsible for introducing the underground language polari to the British public.

Paddick also enjoyed success as Percival Browne in the original West End production of The Boy Friend, in 1954.

Biography
Born in Hoddesdon, Hertfordshire, Paddick preferred theatre to any other form of acting and spent most of his life on the stage, from his first role while at acting school in 1937 until his retirement. He appeared in the original Drury Lane production of My Fair Lady as Colonel Pickering. He was also an accomplished musician – singer, pianist and organist. He can be heard at the piano accompanying Julian and Sandy in a number of their sketches on both Round the Horne and The Bona World of Julian and Sandy.

In his diaries, Kenneth Williams, so often scathing of his colleagues, spoke warmly of Paddick's kindness as a man, and of his "subtlety and brilliance" as a performer.

Paddick was homosexual and lived for over thirty years with his partner Francis, whom he met at a party in London. The two men were keen gardeners at their west London home. He was distantly related to Brian Paddick, now Lord Paddick, Britain's first openly gay police commander.

Paddick died in Milton Keynes, Buckinghamshire, on 9 November 2000, aged 85.

In popular culture
In the 2006 BBC television film Kenneth Williams: Fantabulosa!, about the life of Williams, Paddick was portrayed by Guy Henry.

Films
School for Scoundrels (1960) – Instructor
We Shall See (1964) – Connell
San Ferry Ann (1965) – French Commercial Traveller
The Killing of Sister George (1968) – Freddie
Up Pompeii (1971) – Priest
Up the Chastity Belt (1971) – Robin Hood
That's Your Funeral (1972) – Window Dresser

Television
Here and Now (1956)
 The Two Charleys (1959) – Lionel Stone
The Larkins (1963–1964) – Osbert Rigby-Soames
The Strange World of Gurney Slade (episode 2, 1960) – Fairy
Winning Widows (1961–1962)
Worm's Eye View (play) (1962) see IMDB reference below 
Benny Hill (1963)
Frankie Howerd (1965–1966) 
Pure Gingold (1965)
The Wednesday Play episode: The End of Arthur's Marriage (1965) – House Agent
Before the Fringe (1967)
Beryl Reid Says Good Evening (1968) – Various Roles
Comedy Playhouse (1968–1972) – Bernard Hooper / Sidney Jelliot
The Jimmy Tarbuck Show (1968)
Wink to Me Only (1969) – Sydney Jelliot
Here Come the Double Deckers episode: Summer Camp (1970) – Gerald
Father, Dear Father episode: Housie – Housie (1971), episode: Flat Spin (1973) – Mr. Nash / Fanshawe
The Marty Feldman Comedy Machine (1971) – Various Characters
The Benny Hill Show series 4, episode 1 (1972)
Pardon My Genie (1972, children's comedy series) – The Genie
Tell Tarby (1973)
PG Tips advertisement (1976) (provided the voice of a chimpanzee)
Sykes episode: Television Film (1978) – Nigel Lambshank
The Basil Brush Show (1979)
Can We Get On Now, Please? (1980) – Charles Pettigrew
The Morecambe and Wise Show (1980) – Adrian Fondle / Robin Caress
Rushton's Illustrated (1980)
The Jim Davidson Show (1980–1981) 
Babble (1983)
Jemima Shore Investigates episode: The Crime of the Dancing Duchess (1983) – Tony Jerrold
Blackadder series 3 episode 4: Sense and Senility (1987) – David Keanrick, thespian
Alas Smith and Jones episode 4.5 (1987)
And There's More episode 4.1 (1988) – Various Characters
Boon episode: Never Say Trevor Again (1988) – Don Pettifer
Campion (1990) – 'Beaut' Siegfried
Jackson Pace: The Great Years (1990) – Lord Taggon (Last appearance)

Theatre
Noah (1937) Embassy School of Acting
There's Always Tomorrow (1949) New Wimbledon Theatre
The Thunderbolt (1952) Liverpool Playhouse
The Two Bouquets (1953) St Martin's Theatre
The Boy Friend (1953) Embassy Theatre, (1954) Wyndham's Theatre
The Impresario From Smyrna (1954) Arts Theatre
For Amusement Only (1956) Apollo Theatre
She Smiled At Me (1956) Connaught Theatre
For Adults Only (1958) various theatres
My Fair Lady (1959–1961) Theatre Royal, Drury Lane
See You Inside (1963) Duchess Theatre
Let's Get A Divorce! (1966–1967) Mermaid Theatre
The Madwoman of Chaillot (1967) Oxford Playhouse
They Don't Grow on Trees (1968) Prince of Wales Theatre
Antony and Cleopatra (1969) Chichester Festival Theatre
When We Are Married (1971) Strand Theatre
Cinderella (1974) Casino Theatre
Play by Play (1975) The King's Head Theatre, Islington
Beauty and the Beast (1975) Oxford Playhouse
Some of My Best Friends are Husbands (1976) Mermaid Theatre, (1983) Watford Palace
Out on a Limb (1976) Vaudeville Theatre
Volpone (1977) Royal National Theatre
Half Life (1977–1978) Duke of York's Theatre
Gigi (1980) Haymarket Theatre (Leicester)
Soldier's Fortune (1981) Lyric Hammersmith
Venice Preserv'd (1984) Lyttelton Theatre
Wild Honey (1984) Lyttelton Theatre
Noises Off (1985) Savoy Theatre

Radio
Beyond Our Ken (1958–1964)
Gert and Daisy (1959)
The Men from the Ministry (1965)
Round the Horne (1965–1968)
Stop Messing About (1969)
Share and Share Alike (play) (1978)
A Chaste Maid in Cheapside (play) (1979)
Just Before Midnight (1979)
The 27-Year Itch (1979)
I Love The 27-Year Itch (play) (1980)

References

External links
 Hugh Paddick at the British Film Institute
 

1915 births
2000 deaths
English male comedians
British male comedy actors
English male film actors
English male radio actors
English male stage actors
English male television actors
English gay actors
Gay comedians
People from Hoddesdon
Male actors from Hertfordshire
People from Milton Keynes
Actors from Buckinghamshire
20th-century English male actors
20th-century English comedians
20th-century English LGBT people
English LGBT comedians